The North Corridor is the eighth studio album by American rock band Chevelle, released on July 8, 2016.

Album cover
The album cover for the regular edition features a goat similar to Black Philip from the film The Witch. The alternate cover features Pete Loeffler's son.

Release
On May 10, 2016, the band announced that their new album will be titled The North Corridor, which was released on July 8, 2016. The first single from the album, "Joyride (Omen)", was released to radio in May 2016. The group also added that the first 2016 pre-orders would be signed by the band; but later decided that all pre-orders would be signed due to the servers crashing when the preorders went live. "Door to Door Cannibals" and "Rivers" were also released as singles. The band announced on June 20 that the song "Young Wicked" would be available to everyone who pre-ordered the album on June 23, 2016.

Composition
The North Corridor has been described as alternative metal, hard rock, and post-grunge. The album has been considered the band's heaviest album. The albums focuses more on heavy guitar riffs and lyrical themes influenced by horror. Despite the album's heavier sound, the song "Punchline" utilizes electronic elements.

Critical reception

Critical reception to the album has been generally positive. AllMusic's Neil Yeung has described the album as Chevelle's "heaviest, darkest, and most aggressive effort in over a decade." Stanciu Raul of Sputnikmusic stated "The North Corridor soars like never before, surpassing This Type of Thinking & La Gargola without feeling one-sided. [Chevelle are] always tweaking the overall sound in small amounts, so that you’ll be constantly surprised."

Accolades

Track listing

Personnel

Chevelle
 Pete Loeffler – vocals, guitar, art direction
 Sam Loeffler – drums
 Dean Bernardini – bass, direction, drums and artwork

Technical personnel
 Dave Collins – mastering
 Joe Barresi – producer, mixing
 Marcel Fernandez – assistant producer
 Morgan Stratton – assistant producer

Charts

Weekly charts

Year-end charts

References

2016 albums
Chevelle (band) albums
Epic Records albums
Albums produced by Joe Barresi